Cultural burning may refer to:
 Fire-stick farming in Australia
 Native American use of fire in ecosystems